Georgios Provatas (born 23 February 1976) is a retired Greek football defender.

References

1976 births
Living people
Greek footballers
Egaleo F.C. players
Athinaikos F.C. players
A.O. Kerkyra players
Vyzas F.C. players
Fostiras F.C. players
Agia Paraskevi F.C. players
Proodeftiki F.C. players
A.O. Nea Ionia F.C. players
Association football defenders
Super League Greece players
Sportspeople from Corfu